"The Bizarro Jerry" is the 137th episode of the American television sitcom Seinfeld. This was the third episode of the eighth season, originally airing on the NBC network on October 3, 1996. The title and plot extensively reference Bizarro Superman originally published by DC Comics. This episode introduced the phrase "man-hands.”

Plot 
Elaine breaks up with her boyfriend Kevin, but they decide to remain friends. Kevin proves to be a much more reliable friend than Jerry. Jerry suggests to Elaine that Kevin is "Bizarro Jerry", and explains how the Superman character Bizarro does everything in an opposite manner.

While using the restrooms at a company called Brandt-Leland, Kramer aids an employee with a printer and is mistaken for a co-worker by the staff. He begins showing up at regular work hours with no contract and no pay, simply appreciating the structure that a steady job adds to his life.

Jerry starts dating Gillian, an attractive woman whose only flaw is that she has "man-hands", i.e. her hands are large and strong like a man's. George gets into a club of attractive female models by saying that a photo of Gillian is his late fiancee Susan. He accidentally burns the picture with a hair dryer. Jerry breaks up with Gillian due to her hands. While Jerry tries to get another picture of her from her purse for George, she grabs Jerry's hand, crushing it. Jerry feels neglected at home, now that Kramer is working, Elaine is hanging out with Kevin and his friends Gene and Feldman (Bizarro versions of George and Kramer, respectively), and George refuses to bring him along to the club.

George tries to use a picture of a model from a magazine to get back into the club, but he accidentally approaches the same model from the magazine picture and is kicked out. Jerry, George and Kramer head to the coffee shop and bump into Elaine as she is meeting up with Kevin, Gene and Feldman. Elaine decides to stay with her "Bizarro friends." He invites her over where she meets Vargas, the Bizarro Newman, with whom Kevin is friendly. However, they reject her when they do not take to some of the things she usually does with Jerry, such as eating Kevin's food without asking, and playfully pushing Kevin so hard that he is knocked down. A saddened Elaine takes her leave.

Kramer is terminated by Leland because of his incomprehensible reports, only for Kramer to respond that he doesn't actually work there. Leland acknowledges the difficulty of the situation.

George takes Jerry to the location of the club, but all they find is a meat packing plant, with the photo George took from a magazine lying amid the sawdust.

In a mid-credits scene, Kevin and his friends continue to demonstrate their virtuousness and generosity. After Kevin tells his friends how much he appreciates them, the three gather into a group hug, and Kevin declares, “Me so happy, me want to cry,” imitating Bizarro Superman's distinctive speech pattern.

Production
David Mandel wrote the episode after his then girlfriend Rebecca ended their long-distance relationship. Rebecca, the now wife of Mandel, was self-conscious about what she called her "farm-hands". Part of the new generation of Seinfeld writers who were fans of the show prior to working on it, Mandel saw the opportunity to include such self-referential "meta" humor as the Bizarro characters, as they could rely on audiences being familiar enough with the series to understand the jokes. Mandel has since described it as his favorite episode of the series.

The episode's Kramer story was inspired by how Mandel often assisted customers at Tower Records who mistakenly thought he worked there. An acquaintance of Mandel's was so ashamed of how physically unattractive the woman who dumped him was, when talking about her he would show a photo of a different woman, inspiring the George story.

The "man hands" are all close-ups of a male crew member's hands, while actress Kristin Bauer van Straten's real hands were kept off-camera.

Kevin's apartment was modeled to be a Bizarro opposite of Jerry's apartment, with the kitchen and furniture in reverse of Jerry's. Kevin also has a unicycle hanging on his wall instead of a bicycle like Jerry, and a Bizarro statue in place of Jerry's normal Superman statue. In addition, the exterior of Kevin's apartment is a mirror-image of Jerry's apartment, and the usual musical cues of the show are played backwards during the Bizarro scenes.

Critical reception 

At the time of its original airing, John J. O'Connor of The New York Times explained why he found the episode fun: "'Bizarro Jerry' has found Elaine (Julia Louis-Dreyfus) entering a world of virtual reality with a new boyfriend who eerily resembled Jerry except that he was reliable and considerate. Moreover, his friends were physical clones of George and Kramer (Michael Richards). 'It's like Superman's opposite,' observed Jerry, pinpointing the bizarro of the title. Meanwhile, Jerry was dating a beautiful young woman whose only flaw (flaws are inevitable on Seinfeld) was having man's hands: meaty paws, whined Jerry, 'like a creature out of Greek mythology.' Kramer drifted incomprehensibly into a corporate job in which he 'finally found structure' and was able to strut about with a briefcase full of Ritz crackers."

In a retrospective review of two adjacent episodes, David Sims of The A.V. Club writes, "'The Bizarro Jerry' and 'The Little Kicks' are probably two of the better-known season 8 episodes and for good reason – they're a lot of fun." Sims speculates that "'The Bizarro Jerry' just reeks of a concept that Seinfeld wanted to do forever, given his obsession with Superman, and finally got the chance to once he was fully in charge of the show... Elaine finds that Kevin...and his friends are like a weird mirror group to her friends. But it's very effectively staged that it works, even once the joke has become totally familiar – the idea of characters having strange doubles is now one of the oldest sitcom tropes in the book... Elaine, of course, quickly realizes that the bizarro universe is not for her... the whole time she's more of an interested party than anything, examining the bizarro gang like a scientist." Of the "man-hands" segments, Sims says, "Like many a good Seinfeld episode, there's a B-plot nestled in here that feels like the dominant A-plot of another episode, considering what a major meme it became."

References

External links 

Seinfeld (season 8) episodes
1996 American television episodes
Television episodes written by David Mandel